Forzzaea warasii is a plant species in the genus Forzzaea. This species is endemic to Brazil. It was formerly placed in Cryptanthus.

Cultivars

 Cryptanthus 'Sandy Antle'
 Cryptanthus 'State Trooper'
 Cryptanthus 'Twilight'

References

BSI Cultivar Registry Retrieved 11 October 2009

Bromelioideae
Flora of Brazil